This is a list of threatened ecological communities declared by the Commonwealth of Australia  under the Environment Protection and Biodiversity Conservation Act 1999 ("EPBC Act"), and listed in the Species Profile and Threats Database (SPRAT).

New South Wales and the Australian Capital Territory
listed at SPRAT.

Blue Gum High Forest in the Sydney Basin
Brigalow (Acacia harpophylla dominant and co-dominant)
Buloke Woodlands of the Riverina and Murray-Darling Depression Bioregions
Castlereagh Scribbly Gum and Agnes Banks Woodlands of the Sydney Basin Bioregion
Central Hunter Valley eucalypt forest and woodland
Coastal Swamp Oak (Casuarina glauca) Forest of New South Wales and South East Queensland ecological community
Coastal Upland Swamps in the Sydney Basin Bioregion
Cooks River/Castlereagh Ironbark Forest of the Sydney Basin Bioregion
Coolibah - Black Box Woodlands of the Darling Riverine Plains and the Brigalow Belt South Bioregions
Cumberland Plain Shale Woodlands and Shale-Gravel Transition Forest
Eastern Suburbs Banksia Scrub of the Sydney Region
Grey Box (Eucalyptus microcarpa) Grassy Woodlands and Derived Native Grasslands of South-eastern Australia
Hunter Valley Weeping Myall (Acacia pendula) Woodland
Illawarra and south coast lowland forest and woodland ecological community
Littoral Rainforest and Coastal Vine Thickets of Eastern Australia
Lowland Grassy Woodland in the South East Corner Bioregion
Natural Grasslands of the Murray Valley Plains
New England Peppermint (Eucalyptus nova-anglica) Woodlands
Posidonia australis seagrass meadows of the Manning-Hawkesbury ecoregion
Shale/Sandstone Transition Forest
Southern Highlands Shale Forest and Woodland in the Sydney Basin Bioregion
Subtropical and Temperate Coastal Saltmarsh
Temperate Highland Peat Swamps on Sandstone
Turpentine – Ironbark Forest in the Sydney Basin Bioregion
Upland Wetlands of the New England Tablelands & the Monaro Plateau
Warkworth Sands Woodland of the Hunter Valley
Weeping Myall – Coobah – Scrub Wilga of the Hunter Valley (WM-C-SW)
Weeping Myall Woodlands
White Box-Yellow Box-Blakely's Red Gum Grassy Woodland and Derived Native Grassland
Western Sydney Dry Rainforest and Moist Woodland on Shale

Northern Territory 
listed at SPRAT

 Arnhem Plateau Sandstone Shrubland Complex

Queensland 
listed at SPRAT

 Brigalow (Acacia harpophylla dominant and co-dominant)
 Broad leaf tea-tree (Melaleuca viridiflora) Woodlands in High Rainfall Coastal North Queensland  Littoral Rainforest and Coastal Vine Thickets of Eastern Australia
 Mabi Forest (Complex Notophyll Vine Forest 5b)
 The community of native species dependent on natural discharge of groundwater from the Great Artesian Basin
 Weeping Myall Woodlands
 White Box-Yellow Box-Blakely's Red Gum Grassy Woodland and Derived Native Grassland
 Coastal Swamp Oak (Casuarina glauca) Forest of New South Wales and South East Queensland ecological community
 Subtropical and Temperate Coastal Saltmarsh
 Coolibah - Black Box Woodlands of the Darling Riverine Plains and the Brigalow Belt South Bioregions
 Lowland Rainforests of Subtropical Australia
 Natural Grasslands of the Queensland Central Highlands and the northern Fitzroy Basin
 Natural grasslands on basalt and fine-textured alluvial plains of northern New South Wales and southern Queensland
 New England Peppermint (Eucalyptus nova-anglica) Woodlands
 Semi-evergreen vine thickets of the Brigalow Belt (North and South) and Nandewar Bioregions
 Swamp Tea-tree (Melaleuca irbyana) Forest of South-east Queensland

South Australia 
listed at SPRAT

 Buloke Woodlands of the Riverina and Murray-Darling Depression Bioregions
 Giant Kelp Marine Forests of South East Australia
 Grey Box (Eucalyptus microcarpa) Grassy Woodlands and Derived Native Grasslands of South-eastern Australia
 Iron-grass Natural Temperate Grassland of South Australia
 Peppermint Box (Eucalyptus odorata) Grassy Woodland of South Australia
 Seasonal Herbaceous Wetlands (Freshwater) of the Temperate Lowland Plains
 Swamps of the Fleurieu Peninsula
 The community of native species dependent on natural discharge of groundwater from the Great Artesian Basin
 Eyre Peninsula Blue Gum (Eucalyptus petiolaris) Woodland
 Kangaroo Island Narrow-leaved Mallee (Eucalyptus cneorifolia) Woodland
 Subtropical and Temperate Coastal Saltmarsh
 White Box-Yellow Box-Blakely's Red Gum Grassy Woodland and Derived Native Grassland

Tasmania 
listed at SPRAT

 Alpine Sphagnum Bogs and Associated Fens
 Eucalyptus ovata - Callitris oblonga Forest
 Giant Kelp Marine Forests of South East Australia
 Lowland Native Grasslands of Tasmania
 Subtropical and Temperate Coastal Saltmarsh

Victoria 
listed at SPRAT

 Alpine Sphagnum Bogs and Associated Fens
 Buloke Woodlands of the Riverina and Murray-Darling Depression Bioregions
 Giant Kelp Marine Forests of South East Australia
 Gippsland Red Gum (Eucalyptus tereticornis subsp. mediana) Grassy Woodland and Associated Native Grassland
 Grassy Eucalypt Woodland of the Victorian Volcanic Plain
 Grey Box (Eucalyptus microcarpa) Grassy Woodlands and Derived Native Grasslands of South-eastern Australia
 Littoral Rainforest and Coastal Vine Thickets of East Australia
 Natural Grasslands of the Murray Valley Plains
 Natural Temperate Grassland of the Victorian Volcanic Plain
 NRM Regions
 Seasonal Herbaceous Wetlands (Freshwater) of the Temperate Lowland Plains
 Silurian Limestone Pomaderris Shrubland of the South East Corner and Australian Alps Bioregions (SLPS)
 White Box-Yellow Box-Blakely's Red Gum Grassy Woodland and Derived Native Grassland
 Natural Damp Grassland of the Victorian Coastal Plains
 Natural Temperate Grassland of the South Eastern Highlands
 Subtropical and Temperate Coastal Saltmarsh

Western Australia 
listed at SPRAT

 Aquatic Root Mat Community 1 in Caves of the Leeuwin Naturaliste Ridge
 Thrombolite (microbial) community of coastal freshwater lakes of the Swan Coastal Plain (Lake Richmond)
 Aquatic Root Mat Community 2 in Caves of the Leeuwin Naturaliste Ridge
 Aquatic Root Mat Community 3 in Caves of the Leeuwin Naturaliste Ridge
 Aquatic Root Mat Community 4 in Caves of the Leeuwin Naturaliste Ridge
 Aquatic Root Mat Community in Caves of the Swan Coastal Plain
 Eastern Stirling Range Montane Heath and Thicket
 Perched Wetlands of the Wheatbelt region with extensive stands of living sheoak and paperbark across the lake floor (Toolibin Lake)
 Assemblages of plants and invertebrate animals of tumulus (organic mound) springs of the Swan Coastal Plain
 Corymbia calophylla - Kingia australis woodlands on heavy soils of the Swan Coastal Plain
 Corymbia calophylla - Xanthorrhea preissii woodlands and shrublands of the Swan Coastal Plain
 Sedgelands in Holocene dune swales of the southern Swan Coastal Plain
 Shrublands and Woodlands of the eastern Swan Coastal Plain
 Shrublands and Woodlands on Muchea Limestone of the Swan Coastal Plain
 Shrublands and Woodlands on Perth to Gingin ironstone (Perth to Gingin ironstone association) of the Swan Coastal Plain
 Shrublands on southern Swan Coastal Plain ironstones
 Thrombolite (microbialite) Community of a Coastal Brackish Lake (Lake Clifton)
 Claypans of the Swan Coastal Plain
 Monsoon vine thickets on the coastal sand dunes of Dampier Peninsula
 Banksia Woodlands of the Swan Coastal Plain ecological community
 Eucalypt Woodlands of the Western Australian Wheatbelt
 Proteaceae Dominated Kwongan Shrublands of the Southeast Coastal Floristic Province of Western Australia
 Scott River Ironstone Association
 Subtropical and Temperate Coastal Saltmarsh

References

Biogeography of Australia
Endangered ecological communities
Vegetation of Australia
Ecoregions of Australia